Otto Wanz (June 13, 1943 – September 14, 2017) was an Austrian professional wrestler and boxer. He made his professional wrestling debut in 1968. He is a one time American Wrestling Association champion and former operator of the Catch Wrestling Association, where he was the promotion's inaugural World Heavyweight Champion, winning the title four times. He is overall a five-time world champion and the longest reigning world champion in Europe.

Professional wrestling career
Born in Nestelbach, Austria on June 13, 1943, Wanz made his professional wrestling debut in 1968 in his native Austria. Later on he would work as "Bulldog" Otto in Japan, primarily working for New Japan Pro-Wrestling (NJPW).

In the early 1970s he created the Catch Wrestling Association (CWA) based in Austria but promoting shows in the surrounding countries as well. On August 2, 1977 Wanz defeated Jan Wilkens on a show in Cape Town, South Africa to become the first holder of the CWA World Heavyweight Championship, bringing the championship back to Europe once the tour was over. Over the next two years Wanz defended the championship in Austria and Germany on several occasions, before losing to Don Leo Jonathan on September 1 in Johannesburg, South Africa. Wanz brought Jonathan to Graz, Austria to win the championship for a second time in front of a home town crowd. In Germany, he wrestled Andre the Giant and was one of the few wrestlers to bodyslam him. 

While in the US during a 1982 tour, he worked for Verne Gagne's American Wrestling Association (AWA) where he defeated long-reigning AWA World Heavyweight Champion Nick Bockwinkel to win the AWA title on August 29, 1982. The reign ended 41 days later as Bockwinkel regained the championship on October 9.

Returning to the CWA, Wanz spent several years as the champion until March 22, 1987 where an American power house wrestler known as Bull Power defeated him for the championship. Wanz regained the title a few months later but Bull Power started a second reign in 1989. On June 30, 1990 Wanz won the CWA Championship for a fourth time. After the match, Wanz retired from active competition to focus on promoting the CWA.

Personal life
Before entering professional wrestling, Wanz was a boxer, winning two Austrian boxing championships. He was also an amateur wrestler. Wanz also organized strong men competitions in Austria. He was listed in the Guinness Book of World Records tearing telephone books. Arnold Schwarzenegger has cited Wanz as an influence on his fitness and bodybuilding career.

Wanz died on September 14, 2017.

Championships and accomplishments
American Wrestling Association
AWA World Heavyweight Championship (1 time)
Catch Wrestling Association
CWA World Heavyweight Championship (4 times)
Pro Wrestling Illustrated
PWI ranked him #135 of the top 500 singles wrestlers of the "PWI Years" in 2003

References

External links

1943 births
2017 deaths
Austrian male professional wrestlers
AWA World Heavyweight Champions
Professional wrestling executives
20th-century professional wrestlers
People from Graz-Umgebung District